Soundings is a single-movement orchestral composition by the American composer John Williams.  It was commissioned by the Los Angeles Philharmonic for the inaugural season of the Walt Disney Concert Hall.  It was first performed on October 25, 2003 by the Los Angeles Philharmonic under the direction of Williams.

Composition

Soundings has a duration of roughly 15 minutes and is composed in one continuous movement divided into five sections:
The Hall Awakens
The Hall Glistens
The Hall Responds
The Hall Sings
The Hall Rejoices

Williams described his inspiration for the piece in the score program notes, remarking, "In writing Soundings, I've tended to think of it as an experimental piece for Walt Disney Concert Hall in which a collection of colorful sonorities could be sampled in the Los Angeles Philharmonic's new environment."

Instrumentation
The work is scored for a large orchestra consisting of four flutes (3rd and 4th doubling piccolo), three oboes (3rd doubling English horn), three clarinets (2nd doubling E-flat clarinet; 3rd doubling bass clarinet), three bassoons (3rd doubling contrabassoon), six horns, three trumpets, three trombones, tuba, timpani, percussion, harp, piano, synthesizer, celesta, and strings.

Reception
Reviewing the world premiere, Mark Swed of the Los Angeles Times wrote, "If not strong on musical ideas, Soundings, which opened the program, was strong on sound. It began in silence -- a silence broken by the whirring noise of fans from the television lights (the PBS broadcast is Wednesday). Flutes and percussion then rustled to represent the hall awakening. As he is in film scores, Williams is most successful in creating a sense of expectation."  He continued:

However, Zachary Woolfe of The New York Times was considerably less enthusiastic about the piece.  Reviewing a 2016 performance at David Geffen Hall, Woolfe described the music as being "thoroughly outclassed" by other works on the program (which included Alberto Ginastera's Piano Concerto No. 1 and Andrew Norman's Play), adding that it was "never less and never more than professional, without a moment of the sparkling originality that permeates the work of Ginastera and Mr. Norman."

See also
 List of compositions by John Williams

References

Compositions by John Williams
2003 compositions
Compositions for symphony orchestra
Music commissioned by the Los Angeles Philharmonic